"F*ck For the Road" (clean version titled "For the Road") is a song by American hip hop recording artist Tyga. It was released on April 4, 2013, as the second official single from his third studio album Hotel California. The song, produced by Grand Hustle record producers Cordale "Lil' C" Quinn and Mars of 1500 or Nothin', features a guest appearance from American singer Chris Brown. The song samples "Rain" by SWV.

Background 
In February 2013, Tyga announced during an interview that the second official single from the album would be titled "For the Road", and feature frequent collaborator Chris Brown. Tyga said the song has the same feeling as their hit "Deuces". The song is produced by Lil C and was premiered on March 25. The song was then released for digital download on April 4, 2013 along with the pre-order for the album. On May 14, 2013 the song was released to Rhythmic contemporary radio along with the third single "Show You".

Critical response
It was panned by PopMatters: "Likewise, "For the Road" (formerly "Fuck for the Road") is such an utter clash of lowbrow concept and pre-teen shine that Chris Brown ought to have been paired with a more ludicrous rapper in the Lil Boosie or Busta Rhymes mold.."

Music video
The music video for "For the Road" was filmed on April 21, 2013, and was directed by Colin Tilley. The music video premiered on MTV Jams on May 19, 2013.

Track listing
 Digital single

Charts

Release history

References

2013 singles
Cash Money Records singles
Chris Brown songs
Tyga songs
Music videos directed by Colin Tilley
Songs written by Chris Brown
2013 songs
Songs written by Tyga
Songs written by Jaco Pastorius
Songs written by Tupac Shakur
Songs written by Lil' C (record producer)
Songs written by Lamar Edwards